Heart Tuned to D.E.A.D. is the only album by the British indie rock band Switches. It was released in the UK on 23 April 2007. The album was released in the US as Lay Down the Law on March 18, 2008, with the omission of "Give Up the Ghost".The title is a possible reference to the Super Furry Animals song "Bass Tuned to D.E.A.D".

The album currently holds a 76/100 metascore at Metacritic.

Track listing
"Drama Queen" – 2:59
"Snakes and Ladders" – 3:37
"Lay Down the Law" – 2:45
"Coming Down" – 3:19
"Give Up the Ghost" – 3:23
"The Need to Be Needed" – 3:34
"Message from Yuz" – 2:41
"Every Second Counts" – 3:32
"Step Kids in Love" – 3:19
"Lovin' It" – 3:40
"Killer Karma" – 3:59
"Testify" – 4:23

Lay Down the Law Track listing
"Drama Queen" – 2:59
"Snakes and Ladders" – 3:37
"Lay Down the Law" – 2:45
"Coming Down" – 3:19
"The Need to Be Needed" – 3:34
"Message from Yuz" – 2:41
"Every Second Counts" – 3:32
"Step Kids in Love" – 3:19
"Lovin' It" – 3:40
"Killer Karma" – 3:59
"Testify" – 4:23

Release history

Charts

In popular culture
The song "Drama Queen" is featured in the video game by EA Sports, FIFA 08 and the theatrical trailer of Friday the 13th (2009).
The song "Lay Down the Law" is featured in the film Jumper (2008).
The song "Message From Yuz" is featured in the film Sex Drive (2008).

2007 albums
Atlantic Records albums
Switches (band) albums